Chapekar Brothers is a  Hindi-language film directed by Devendar Kumar Pandey. The film features Abhijit Bhagat, Sanjeet Dhuri and Manoj Bhatt as the Chapekar brothers, Indian revolutionaries involved in the 1896 assassination of the British Plague Commissioner of Pune, W C Rand. The film is produced by Ghanshyam Patel of Giriva Productions. The screenplay and dialogue was written by Dhiraj Mishra. Vikas Dixit is the line producer of the movie.

Cast
 Abhijeet Bhagat as Damodar Chapekar
 Sanjeet Dhuri as Balkrishna Chapekar
 Manoj Bhatt as Vashudev Chapekar
 Govind Namdeo as Bal Gangadhar Tilak
 Akhilesh Jain as Haripant Chapekar 
 Raj  Sharnagat  as  Sathe
 Megha Joshi as Damodar Chapekar's wife 
 Kanchan Awasthi as Balkrishna Chapekar's wife  
 Kumkum Das as Laxmibai
 Hemant Jha as Mr. Rand

Production

Principal photography of the movie was in progress in Baroda. Film completed in July 2016 and slated to release on 23 September 2016.

Controversy
Chapekar Brothers received a diktat from the Censor Board over a film scene. The Censor Board had raised issues during the screening of the film over a scene in which one of the Chapekar Brothers had killed a Christian Missionary forcing Hindus to convert into Christianity during the British Raj. The filmmakers objected to this diktat by showing references of a Marathi film ’22 June 1897’ released in the year 1979 depicting the same scene. Post that incident, MNS President Raj Thackeray has pledged his full support to the movie and slammed the Censor Board.

References

External links
 
 

2016 films